Judy Gilroy is an Irish television presenter working for City Channel. She graduated from University College Dublin (UCD) with an honours degree in Business and Legal Studies in 2008 before moving into television. She is a television presenter and producer with City Channel. where she presents and produces a number of programmes in the genre of entertainment.

References

Year of birth missing (living people)
Living people
Alumni of University College Dublin
Television presenters from the Republic of Ireland